The  Department of Economic And Social Geography of Russia is one of the oldest and the largest  Russian educational and research centers in economic geography and regional science

History 

The Department of Economic And Social Geography of Russia is the oldest department of the geographical faculty in Moscow State University. It was founded in 1929 by Nikolay Baranskiy as a chair of economic geography on geographical branch of the mehaniko-mathematical faculty. In 1933 it was a part of the soil-geographical faculty as a Chair of Economic Geography of the USSR. After foundation of the geographical faculty in Moscow State University in 1938, the department became a constant division in its structure. Since 1992 it has been called the department of economic and social geography of Russia.

The first head of the department was its founder, N. Baranskiy, professor of the faculty and member-correspondent in Russian Academy of Sciences. Throughout its 80-year history the department has been headed by professor P. Stepanov (1941–1943; 1946–1949), Julian G. Saushkin (1349–1381), A. T. Khruschev (1981–2000), Vladimir E. Shuvalov (2000-2012) and V. Baburin (since July 2012).

Scientists of the chair have created a school of thought known as the Soviet Regional (Rayon) school of economic geography. Its theoretical bases have been made by professors Nikolay Baranskiy and Nikolay Kolosovskiy and were developed by J. Saushkin's works. Many professors of the department brought the big contributions to the formation and development of the theory and methodology of social and economic geography, especially geography of industry, agriculture, transport, non-productive sphere, geography of the population, geourbanistics, and methods of economic-geographical researches.

Staff 

The staff includes 6 doctors, 14 candidates of sciences, 6 professors, 9 senior lecturers, 1 assistant, 6 scientific employees and 5 leading engineers.

Professors:

 Evgeny Pertsik
 Vyacheslav Baburin
 Natalia Zubarevich
 Alexander Alekseev 
 Alexander Pilyasov

Specialization 

 General questions of social and economic geography
 Economic geography
 Social geography
 Political geography
 Population and Geography of migration
 Geography of branches of key spheres of economy
 Wildlife management and the economic organization of territory
 Geourbanistics
 Regional problems of social and economic development
 Territorial planning, designing and management
 Regional policy

Training courses 
 Social and economic indexes of regions and countries
 Geography of population with demography bases
 Technical and economic bases of industrial and agricultural production
 Geography of agriculture, transport, an investment complex, sector of services
 Recreational geography
 Geourbanistics
 Cultural geography
 Political geography
 Economic-geographical problems of wildlife management
 City Ecology
 Bases of the budgetary policy
 Institutsional factors of regional development
 Bases of a regional policy
 Technique of economic-geographical researches
 Social and economic cartography
 Mathematical methods in social and economic geography
 Geography of areas of Russia and the Near abroad countries
 Modern problems of regional development
 Territorial self-organisation of society
 Economic-geographical expertise

Leading directions of scientific research 

 Evolution of territorial organisation of society
 Transformation of social and economic space of Russia
 Social and economic development of regions of Russia and the new independent states
 Complex economic-geographical researches of regions
 Social and economic and environmental problems of development of cities
 Territorial planning and designing
 Territorial administration and self-management
 Theory and methodology of economic and social geography.

See also

 MSU Faculty of Geography
 Nikolay Baranskiy
 Nikolay Kolosovskiy
 Vyacheslav Baburin

External links

* The Official site of the Department

* The Information on a site of Geographical faculty of Moscow State University
Official site of the faculty of Geography
The Information on a site of Geographical faculty of Moscow State University

References

Moscow State University
Geography education in Russia
Education in the Soviet Union
Education in Moscow